A general election was held in the U.S. state of Colorado on November 6, 2018. All of Colorado's executive offices and all seven of its seats in the United States House of Representatives were up for election. Democrats swept the statewide offices up for election, leaving the Class 2 U.S. Senate seat as the last statewide office held by a Republican.

Governor and lieutenant governor

Incumbent Democratic Governor John Hickenlooper was term-limited. Incumbent Democratic Lieutenant Governor Donna Lynne ran for governor, but was eliminated in the Democratic primary on June 26, 2018.

Results

Attorney general

Incumbent Republican attorney general Cynthia Coffman ran for governor, but was eliminated at the state Republican party convention in April.

Democratic primary

Declared
 Joe Salazar, state representative
 Phil Weiser, former dean of the University of Colorado Law School

Campaign suspended
 Michael Dougherty, district attorney for Colorado's Twentieth Judicial District
 Amy Padden, federal prosecutor
 Brad Levin, attorney

Endorsements

Polling

Results

Republican primary

Declared
 George Brauchler, district attorney for Colorado's 18th Judicial District

Results

General election

Endorsements

Polling

Joe Salazar vs. George Brauchler

Results

Secretary of state
Incumbent Republican Secretary of State Wayne Williams was eligible to run for re-election to a second term.

Democratic primary

Declared
 Jena Griswold, lawyer and small business owner

Eliminated at convention
 Phillip Villard

Withdrawn
 Gabriel McArthur

Results

Republican primary

Declared
 Wayne Williams, incumbent Secretary of State of Colorado

Endorsements

Results

General election

Predictions

Endorsements

Results

State treasurer
Incumbent Republican state treasurer Walker Stapleton was term-limited and could not run for a third consecutive term in office. He was the unsuccessful Republican nominee for Governor of Colorado.

Democratic primary

Declared
 Bernard Douthit, businessman
 Dave Young, state representative

Eliminated at convention
Charles Scheibe, chief financial officer of the Colorado Department of Treasury

Disqualified
 Steve Lebsock, state representative

Endorsements

Results

Republican primary
 Justin Everett, state representative
 Polly Lawrence, state representative
 Brian Watson, businessman

Eliminated at convention
 Brita Horn, Routt County treasurer
 Brett Barkey, district attorney for Colorado's 14th judicial district
 Kevin Lundberg, state senator

Declined
 Owen Hill, state senator (running for CO-05)
 Tim Kauffman, Jefferson County Treasurer
 Nic Morse, nominee for CO-02 in 2016

Results

General election

Results

Colorado State Board of Education

Two seats on the seven-member State Board of Education were up for election in 2018. These included the 2nd district seat currently held by Democrat Angelika Schroeder and the 4th district seat held by Republican Pam Mazanec.

State Board of Education member, Congressional District 2

Results

State Board of Education member, Congressional District 4

Results

Regents of the University of Colorado

Three seats on the nine-member University of Colorado Board of Regents were up for election in 2018. These included the at-large seat currently held by Democrat Stephen C. Ludwig, the 3rd district seat held by Republican Glen Gallegos, and the 5th district seat held by Republican Kyle Hybl.

Declared

At-Large

 Christopher E. Otwell (Unity)
 Ken Montera (Republican)
 Lesley Smith (Democrat)

Eliminated at convention
 Jason Robinson (Democrat)
 Chantell Taylor (Democrat)

Results

CU Regent At-Large

CU Regent District 3

Results

CU Regent District 5

 Chance Hill (Republican)
 Tony Wolusky (Democrat)

Results

State legislature

State senate

In the 2018 elections, 17 of the 35 seats in the Colorado State Senate were on the ballot. Democrats gained two seats and a 19-16 majority, which ended Republican control of the chamber.

State house

In the 2018 elections, all 65 seats in the Colorado House of Representatives were up for election. Democrats were able to expand their majority to 41-24, due to gaining five seats from the Republicans.

United States House of Representatives

All of Colorado's seven seats in the United States House of Representatives were up for election in 2018.

District 20 District Attorney

General election candidates
 Michael Dougherty, district attorney for Colorado's Twentieth Judicial District

Democratic primary
 Michael Dougherty, district attorney for Colorado's Twentieth Judicial District
 Mike Foote, Colorado State Representative for Colorado District 30

References

External links
Candidates at Vote Smart
Candidates at Ballotpedia
Campaign finance at OpenSecrets

Official Attorney General campaign websites
George Brauchler (R) for Attorney General
Phil Weiser (D) for Attorney General

Official Secretary of State campaign websites
Jena Griswold (D) for Secretary of State
Wayne Williams (R) for Secretary of State

Official State Treasurer campaign websites
Brian Watson (R) for State Treasurer
Dave Young (D) for State Treasurer

Official State Board of Education district 2 campaign websites
Johnny Barrett (R) for State Board 
Angelika Schroeder (D) for State Board

Official State Board of Education district 4 campaign websites
Debora Scheffel (R) for State Board 

Official Regents of the University of Colorado at-large campaign websites
Ken Montera (R) for CU Regent
Lesley Smith (D) for CU Regent 

Official Regents of the University of Colorado district 3 campaign websites
Glen Gallegos (R) for CU Regent
Alvin Rivera (D) for CU Regent 

Official Regents of the University of Colorado district 5 campaign websites
Chance Hill (R) for CU Regent
Tony Wolusky (D) for CU Regent

Official district 20 District Attorney campaign websites
Michael Dougherty (D) for District Attorney

 
Colorado